Eastside Lutheran College (ELC) is located in Warrane, Tasmania, in Australia. It is a co-educational Lutheran college, catering for Kindergarten to Year 12. ELC has approximately 400 students. When St Peter's Lutheran school was relocated to Warrane, it expanded to become a primary and secondary school under the current name.

History

Eastside Drive-In
Built on former farmland, a drive-in cinema designed by Cheesman Doley Brabham & Neighbour architects opened as the Eastside Drive-In on the site in 1966. Accommodating 418 cars, the screen measured  in size, then the largest in Australia. The Australian Red Cross received all the revenues from the opening picture, The Sound of Music starring Julie Andrews. The drive-in was highly profitable in the years following the Tasman Bridge disaster, which separated the eastern shore from the Hobart CBD. After 18 years of operation, Village Cinemas shut down the venue in 1984. The former projection room and café survives as part of the Eastside Lutheran College, housing the institution's administrative offices.

Establishment of the college
Eastside Lutheran College (originally named St Peter's Lutheran School) was established in 1982 by St Peter's Lutheran Church in Hobart. ELC was originally located in the home next to the original Lutheran church in Davey Street. In 1985, when student enrolment numbers increased, ELC moved to its new property on the eastern shore of the Derwent River and became known as Eastside Christian School Lindisfarne. By the end of 2002, the school moved towards a secondary curriculum. In November 2004, it was decided to change the name from Eastside Christian School to Eastside Lutheran College. The college is affiliated with the Lutheran Church of Australia and is supported by Lutheran Education Victoria, New South Wales and Tasmania.

House system 
As with most Tasmanian schools, Eastside Lutheran College utilises a house system. The college houses are:
 Bass - gold
 Flinders - green
 Mawson - blue

These house teams are used in school sport events, including the primary school swimming carnival, college sports carnival, and cross country.

Co-curriculum 
Eastside Lutheran College offers a variety of co-curriculum programs. As the college has continued to expand, the college has been able to establish new programs, such as:
 Cheerleading
 Choir
 Drama
 Instrumental music
 Extracurricular sport teams
 Duke of Edinburgh Award

Arts 
There is a wide range of programs and electives offered to the students, such as short courses in visual arts, photography and sculpture, extension academic programs, psychology, philosophy, outdoor education, and a Nature Play Kindergarten.

Music 
The college has an instrumental tuition program, in which students can learn a variety of instruments in an individual and small group learning environment. The college also offers a band program, and many performance opportunities at school assemblies, eisteddfods, and community events. The college junior choir and senior choir perform in the local community events, Clarence City Eisteddfod, and the Festival of Voices.

Sport 
The college is active in local interschool athletics and swimming events in Tasmania. The college runs a cheerleading program that regularly participates in local cheerleading competitions run by World Cup Cheer and Dance and with an Olympic coach. It has a number of extracurricular sport teams that change each year depending on need and interest.

See also 
 Drive-in theatres in Australia
 List of Lutheran schools in Australia
 List of theatres in Hobart

References

External links 

 

Private primary schools in Hobart
Private secondary schools in Hobart
Lutheran schools in Australia
Educational institutions established in 1982
1982 establishments in Australia
High schools and secondary schools affiliated with the Lutheran Church
Elementary and primary schools affiliated with the Lutheran Church